Major General Sir George Frederick Johnson,  (28 November 1903 – 23 July 1980) was a senior British Army officer who fought in the Second World War and was Major-General commanding the Household Brigade and General Officer Commanding London District.

Early life and education

Johnson was born at Castlesteads House in Walton, Cumberland, to Frederick Ponsonby Johnson and Frances Mary Gray, daughter of William Gray. Sir Frederick Hankey was his grandfather and Sir Robert Johnson was a cousin. He was educated at Eton College and  King's College, Cambridge.

Military career
He entered the Royal Military College, Sandhurst and was commissioned as a second lieutenant into the Scots Guards in 1925. Promoted to lieutenant on 28 November 1925, he attended the Staff College, Camberley, from 1934 to 1935. He then served in Palestine during the Arab revolt as a General Staff Officer Grade 3 (GSO3) with the 5th Division, before appointed a GSO at London District in 1939.

He served in the Second World War, becoming Commanding Officer (CO) of the 3rd Battalion, Scots Guards in 1940. He went on to be Commander of 201st Guards Motor Brigade Group and was captured while fighting in the Western Desert Campaign in North Africa in 1942 and became a prisoner of war in Italy, but escaped in 1943. In December 1943 he succeeded Brigadier John Marriott in command of the 32nd Guards Brigade, part of Major General Allan Adair's Guards Armoured Division, commanding the brigade throughout the campaign in North West Europe from 1944 to 1945.

In July 1945, he handed over the brigade to Brigadier Joe Vandeleur and commanded the Scots Guards and then became commander of the 1st Guards Brigade in Palestine during the Palestine Emergency in 1947. In 1949 he was made Chief of Staff at Scottish Command and in 1953 he was appointed Major-General commanding the Household Brigade and General Officer Commanding (GOC) London District. He retired in 1957.

He lived at Castlesteads near Brampton in Cumbria. He was appointed High Sheriff of Cumberland for 1966.

Family
In 1938, he married Lady Ida Mary Ramsay, daughter of the 14th Earl Dalhousie, at Brechin Cathedral. They received a silver bowl from King George VI and Queen Elizabeth as a wedding present. They had one daughter and two sons.

References

External links
Generals of World War II

 

1903 births
1980 deaths
Military personnel from Cumberland
British Army major generals
British Army personnel of World War II
British military personnel of the 1936–1939 Arab revolt in Palestine
British military personnel of the Palestine Emergency
British World War II prisoners of war
Commanders of the Order of the British Empire
Companions of the Distinguished Service Order
Companions of the Order of the Bath
Graduates of the Royal Military College, Sandhurst
Graduates of the Staff College, Camberley
High Sheriffs of Cumberland
Knights Commander of the Royal Victorian Order
Scots Guards officers
World War II prisoners of war held by Italy
People educated at Eton College
Alumni of King's College, Cambridge